Omophagus artus is a species of beetle in the family Carabidae, the only species in the genus Omophagus.

References

Lebiinae